Actia dimorpha is a species of tachinid flies in the genus Actia of the family Tachinidae.  The species was first described in 1991 in Sapelo Island, Georgia, United States.

References

dimorpha
Insects described in 1991